Delhi Music Academy is a music school in the Indian capital New Delhi training students in both instrumental and vocal music. It teaches both Indian as well as Western classical music.

History
It was started early in 2001 with musician Syed Nozrul. It consists of a wide range of students learning various forms of music as a hobby and also as a profession.

Faculty
Syed Nozrul chairmanchairman, Director of the Delhi Music Academy is a music graduate from the Delhi University and is Master of Arts in Indian Classical Music. He is also a singer composer and a sound arranger and works in various recording studios in Delhi.

Students
A lot of students join the Delhi Music Academy to learn the basics in music and even to take it as a profession. Generally the students are teenagers to College students.

See also
  Delhi University

Notes

Music schools in India
Schools in Delhi
Educational institutions established in 2001
2001 establishments in Delhi